Ofoten is a former municipality in Nordland county, Norway. The  municipality existed from 1838 until its dissolution in 1884. The municipality included the areas on both sides of the inner part of the Ofotfjorden mostly in what is now the municipalities of Narvik, Ballangen, and Evenes. The administrative centre of Ofoten was the village of Narvik (which later became a town in 1902). After the municipality was dissolved in 1884, the name Ofoten has been used to refer to the region that once was this municipality.

History

The municipality of Ofoten was established on 1 January 1838 (see formannskapsdistrikt law). On 1 January 1884, the municipality ceased to exist when it was split into two municipalities: Ankenes (population: 1,734) in the east and Evindnæs (population: 2,397) in the west.

Name
The municipality (originally the parish) is named after the local Ofotfjorden since the fjord is the central feature of the area as well as the name of the whole Ofoten region. The first element of the name has an uncertain meaning. The oldest form of the name could have been . The three inner branches of the Ofotfjord might have been compared with the three claws of an owl.

Government
During its existence, this municipality was governed by a municipal council of elected representatives, which in turn elected a mayor.

Mayors
The mayors of Ofoten:

 1838–1844: Johan Klitzing Iversen 
 1844–1846: unknown	 
 1846–1848: Johan Klitzing Iversen  
 1848–1852: Peder Slangerup Schjønning  
 1852–1854: unknown	 
 1854–1856: Johan Klitzing Iversen 
 1857–1858: Martinius P. Hønich Jensen 
 1859–1866: Johan Christian Dahlsen 
 1867–1872: Hans Olai Christoffersen  
 1873–1875: Johan T.S. Østberg 
 1875–1881: Esten A. Osmark  
 1882–1884: Bertheus Normann

See also
List of former municipalities of Norway
Ofoten - a geographical area within Nordland county

References

Narvik
Former municipalities of Norway
1838 establishments in Norway
1884 disestablishments in Norway